The 1856 United States presidential election in Virginia took place on November 4, 1856, as part of the 1856 United States presidential election. Voters chose 15  representatives, or electors to the Electoral College, who voted for president and vice president.

Virginia voted for the Democratic candidate, former United States Minister to the United Kingdom James Buchanan over the American candidate, former President Millard Fillmore. Former U.S. Senator John C. Frémont was also the Republican candidate in this election, but he was not on the ballot in Virginia.  Buchanan won the state with a margin of 19.92%.

Results

References

Virginia
1856
1856 Virginia elections